Lajtha may refer to:
 Old Hungarian spelling of the river Leitha

People with the surname
 László Lajtha

Hungarian-language surnames